Dark Star is a soundtrack by John Carpenter for the 1974 film of the same name. While recorded in 1973, it wasn't released by Citadel until 1980, after the 1979 re-release of the film and the success of Carpenter's 1978 film Halloween. A limited expanded edition was released in 2016 through We Release Whatever The Fuck We Want Records.

Track listing

References

John Carpenter soundtracks
Science fiction film soundtracks
Comedy film soundtracks